Edson Dico Minga (born 31 May 1979) is a retired Congolese-Hong Kong professional footballer who played as a striker.

References

External links
Edson Minga at HKFA

News at kickoff.com

1979 births
Living people
Republic of the Congo international footballers
Republic of the Congo footballers
Association football forwards
Expatriate footballers in Gabon
FC 105 Libreville players
Expatriate soccer players in South Africa
Republic of the Congo expatriate sportspeople in South Africa
Manning Rangers F.C. players
Republic of the Congo expatriate footballers
Expatriate footballers in India
Republic of the Congo expatriate sportspeople in India
Hong Kong First Division League players
Expatriate footballers in Hong Kong
Republic of the Congo expatriate sportspeople in Hong Kong
Hong Kong Rangers FC players
Fourway Athletics players
Kitchee SC players
Sun Hei SC players
Sportspeople from Brazzaville
Hong Kong League XI representative players